Walid Karoui (born 25 March 1996) is a Tunisian football midfielder who currently plays for CS Sfaxien.

References

1994 births
Living people
Tunisian footballers
CS Sfaxien players
Association football midfielders
Tunisian Ligue Professionnelle 1 players
Tunisia international footballers